Mont d'Or (2,175 m) is a mountain of the Bernese Alps of Switzerland, overlooking Le Sépey in the canton of Vaud. It lies on the range between the Lac de l'Hongrin and the valley of Ormont-Dessous, and flanks the Col des Mosses pass.

References

External links
 Mont d'Or on Hikr

Mountains of the Alps
Mountains of the canton of Vaud
Mountains of Switzerland